Peter Stuyvesant (in Dutch also Pieter and Petrus Stuyvesant, ;  1610 – August 1672) was a Dutch colonial officer who served as the last Dutch director-general of the colony of New Netherland from 1647 until it was ceded provisionally to the English in 1664, after which it was split into New York and New Jersey with lesser territory becoming parts of other colonies, and later, states. He was a major figure in the early history of New York City and his name has been given to various landmarks and points of interest throughout the city (e.g. Stuyvesant High School, Stuyvesant Town, Bedford–Stuyvesant neighborhood, etc.).

Stuyvesant's accomplishments as director-general included a great expansion for the settlement of New Amsterdam beyond the southern tip of Manhattan. Among the projects built by Stuyvesant's administration were the protective wall on Wall Street, the canal that became Broad Street, and Broadway. Stuyvesant, himself a member of the Dutch Reformed Church, opposed religious pluralism and came into conflict with Lutherans, Jews, Roman Catholics, and Quakers as they attempted to build places of worship in the city and practice their faiths. Stuyvesant was in particular antisemitic, loathing both the Jewish race and religion.

Early life
Peter Stuyvesant was born around 1610 in Peperga or Scherpenzeel, Friesland, in the Netherlands, to Balthasar Stuyvesant, a Reformed Calvinist minister, and Margaretha Hardenstein. He grew up in Peperga, Scherpenzeel, and Berlikum.

Career
At the age of 20, Stuyvesant went to the University of Franeker, where he studied languages and philosophy, but several years later he was expelled from the school after he seduced the daughter of his landlord. He was then sent to Amsterdam by his father, where Stuyvesant – now using the Latinized version of his first name, "Petrus", to indicate that he had university schooling – joined the Dutch West India Company. In 1630, the company assigned him to be their commercial agent on a small island just off of Brazil, Fernando de Noronha, and then five years later transferred him to the nearby Brazilian state of Pernambuco. In 1638, he was moved again, this time to the colony of Curaçao, the main Dutch naval base in the West Indies, where, just four years later, aged 30, he became the acting governor of that colony, as well as Aruba and Bonaire, a position he held until 1644.

In April 1644, he coordinated and led an attack on the island of Saint Martin—which the Spanish had taken from the Dutch. Peter thought they had few men. When Peter raised the Dutch flag the Spanish fired. A cannonball hit Peter. They lost the battle and Peter had his leg amputated.

Stuyvesant returned to the Netherlands for convalescence, where his right leg was replaced with a wooden peg. Stuyvesant was given the nicknames "Peg Leg Pete" and "Old Silver Nails" because he used a wooden stick studded with silver nails as a prosthesis. The West India Company saw the loss of Stuyvesant's leg as a "Roman" sacrifice, while Stuyvesant himself saw the fact that he did not die from his injury as a sign that God was saving him to do great things. A year later, in May 1645, he was selected by the company to replace Willem Kieft as Director-General of the New Netherland colony, including New Amsterdam, the site of present-day New York City.

New Netherland
Stuyvesant had to wait for his appointment to be confirmed by the Dutch States-General. During that time he married Judith Bayard, who was the daughter of a Huguenot minister, and hailed from Breda. Together, they left Amsterdam in December 1646, and, after stopping at Curaçao, arrived in New Amsterdam by May of 1647.

Kieft's administration of the colony had left the colony in terrible condition. Only a small number of villages remained after Kieft's wars, and many of their inhabitants had been driven away and returned home, leaving only 250 to 300 men able to carry arms. Kieft himself had accumulated a fortune of over 4,000 guilders during his term in office, and become an alcoholic.

Certain that righting New Netherland was the work which God had saved him for, Stuyvesant told its people "I shall govern you as a father his children," and began the task of rebuilding the physical and moral state of the colony. 

In September 1647 he appointed the Nine Men, an advisory council composed of representatives of the colonists, to help rebuild relationships with them, temper his rule with their guidance, and restore New Netherland to the kind of well-run place that the Dutch preferred. 

In 1648 a conflict began between him and Brant Aertzsz van Slechtenhorst, the commissary of the patroonship Rensselaerwijck, which surrounded Fort Orange (present-day Albany). Stuyvesant claimed he had power over Rensselaerwijck, despite special privileges granted to Kiliaen van Rensselaer in the patroonship regulations of 1629. When Van Slechtenhorst refused, Stuyvesant sent a group of soldiers to enforce his orders. The controversy that followed resulted in the founding of the new settlement, Beverwijck.

External threats
The colony of New Netherland had severe external problems. The population was too small and contentious, and the Company provided little military support.  Stuyvesant was usually the loser. The most serious was the economic rivalry with England regarding trade. Secondarily there were small scale military conflicts with neighboring Indian tribes, involving fights between mobile bands on the one hand, and scattered small Dutch outposts on the other. With a large area and limited population, defense was a major challenge. Stuyvesant's greatest success came in  dealing with nearby Swedish colonies, which he defeated and annexed in 1655.  Relations with the English colony of Connecticut were strained, with disputes over ownership of land in the Connecticut valley, and in eastern Long island. The treaty of Hartford of 1650 was advantageous to the English, as Stuyvesant gave up claims to the Connecticut Valley while gaining only a small portion of Long island. In any case Connecticut settlers ignored the treaty and steadily poured into the Hudson Valley, where they agitated against Stuyvesant. In 1664, England moved to take over New Netherland. The Dutch colonists refused to fight, forcing Stuyvesant's surrender, demonstrating the dilemma of domestic dissatisfaction, small size, and overwhelming external pressures with inadequate military support from the Company that was fixated on profits.

Expansion of the colony
Stuyvesant became involved in a dispute with Theophilus Eaton, the governor of English New Haven Colony, over the border of the two colonies. In September 1650, a meeting of the commissioners on boundaries took place in Hartford, Connecticut, called the Treaty of Hartford, to settle the border between New Amsterdam and the English colonies to the north and east. The border was arranged to the dissatisfaction of the Nine Men, who declared that "the governor had ceded away enough territory to found fifty colonies each fifty miles square." Stuyvesant then threatened to dissolve the council. A new plan of municipal government was arranged in the Netherlands, and the name "New Amsterdam" was officially declared on 2 February 1653. Stuyvesant made a speech for the occasion, saying that his authority would remain undiminished.

Stuyvesant was then ordered to the Netherlands, but the order was soon revoked under pressure from the States of Holland and the city of Amsterdam. Stuyvesant prepared against an attack by ordering the citizens to dig a ditch from the North River to the East River and to erect a fortification.

In 1653, a convention of two deputies from each village in New Netherland demanded reforms, and Stuyvesant commanded that assembly to disperse, saying: "We derive our authority from God and the company, not from a few ignorant subjects."

In the summer of 1655, he sailed down the Delaware River with a fleet of seven vessels and about 700 men and took possession of the colony of New Sweden, which was renamed "New Amstel." In his absence, Pavonia was attacked by Native Americans, during the "Peach War" on 15 September 1655.

In 1657, the directors of the Dutch West India Company wrote to Stuyvesant to tell him that they were not going to be able to send him all the tradesmen that he requested and that he would have to purchase slaves in addition to the tradesmen he would receive.

During the colonial era, New York City became both a site from which fugitives fled bondage and a destination for runaways. The colonies closest to New Netherland, Connecticut and Maryland, encouraged Dutch slaves to escape and refused to return them. In 1650, Governor Petrus Stuyvesant threatened to offer freedom to Maryland slaves unless that colony stopped sheltering runaways from the Dutch outpost. However, he is also noted as having trafficked minority settlers at auction.

In 1660, Stuyvesant was quoted as saying that "Nothing is of greater importance than the early instruction of youth." In 1661, New Amsterdam had one grammar school, two free elementary schools, and had licensed 28 schoolmasters.

Religious freedom

Stuyvesant did not tolerate full religious freedom in the colony, and was strongly committed to the supremacy of the Dutch Reformed Church. In 1657 he refused to allow Lutherans the right to organize a church. When he also issued an ordinance forbidding them from worshiping in their own homes, the directors of the Dutch West Indies Company, three of whom were Lutherans, told him to rescind the order and allow private gatherings of Lutherans. The Company position was that more tolerance led to more trade and more profit.

Freedom of religion was further tested when Stuyvesant refused to allow the permanent settlement of Jewish refugees from Dutch Brazil in New Amsterdam (without passports), and join the handful of existing Jewish traders (with passports from Amsterdam). Stuyvesant attempted to have Jews "in a friendly way to depart" the colony. As he wrote to the Amsterdam Chamber of the Dutch West India Company in 1654, he hoped that "the deceitful race, — such hateful enemies and blasphemers of the name of Christ, — be not allowed to further infect and trouble this new colony." He referred to Jews as a "repugnant race" and "usurers", and was concerned that "Jewish settlers should not be granted the same liberties enjoyed by Jews in Holland, lest members of other persecuted minority groups, such as Roman Catholics, be attracted to the colony."

Stuyvesant's decision was again rescinded after pressure from the directors of the company. As a result, Jewish immigrants were allowed to stay in the colony as long as their community was self-supporting, however, Stuyvesant and the company would not allow them to build a synagogue, forcing them to worship instead in a private house.

In 1657, the Quakers, who were newly arrived in the colony, drew his attention. He ordered the public torture of Robert Hodgson, a 23-year-old Quaker convert who had become an influential preacher. Stuyvesant then made an ordinance, punishable by fine and imprisonment, against anyone found guilty of harboring Quakers. That action led to a protest from the citizens of Flushing, which came to be known as the Flushing Remonstrance, considered by some historians a precursor to the United States Constitution's provision on freedom of religion in the Bill of Rights.

Capitulation

In 1664, King Charles II of England ceded to his brother, the Duke of York, later King James II, a large tract of land that included all of New Netherland. This came at a period of considerable conflict between England and the Netherlands in the Anglo-Dutch Wars. Four English ships bearing 450 men, commanded by Richard Nicolls, seized the Dutch colony. On 30 August 1664, George Cartwright sent the governor a letter demanding surrender. He promised "life, estate, and liberty to all who would submit to the king's authority."

On 6 September 1664, Stuyvesant sent Johannes de Decker, a lawyer for the West India Company, and five others to sign the Articles of Capitulation. Nicolls was declared governor, and the city was renamed New York. Stuyvesant obtained civil rights and freedom of religion in the Articles of Capitulation. The Dutch settlers mainly belonged to the Dutch Reformed church, a Calvinist denomination, holding to the Three Forms of Unity (Belgic Confession, Heidelberg Catechism, Canons of Dordt). The English were Anglicans, holding to the 39 Articles, a Protestant confession, with bishops.

In 1665, Stuyvesant went to the Netherlands to report on his term as governor. On his return to the colony, he spent the remainder of his life on his farm, Stuyvesant Farm, of sixty-two acres outside the city, called the Great Bouwerie, beyond which stretched the woods and swamps of the village of Nieuw Haarlem. A pear tree that he reputedly brought from the Netherlands in 1647 remained at the corner of Thirteenth Street and Third Avenue until 1867 when it was destroyed by a storm, bearing fruit almost to the last. The house was destroyed by fire in 1777. He also built an executive mansion of stone called Whitehall.

Personal life
In 1645, Stuyvesant married Judith Bayard (–1687) of the Bayard family. Her brother, Samuel Bayard, was the husband of Stuyvesant's sister, Anna Stuyvesant. Petrus and Judith had two sons together:

 Balthasar Lazarus Stuyvesant (1647–1678), who settled in the West Indies and married Maria Lucas Raapzaat
 Nicolaes Willem Stuyvesant (1648–1698), who first married Maria Beekman (1650–1679), daughter of Wilhelmus Beekman, and after her death, Elisabeth Slechtenhorst.

He died in August 1672 and his body was entombed in the east wall of St. Mark's Church in-the-Bowery, which sits on the site of Stuyvesant's family chapel.

Descendants

The last acknowledged descendant of Peter Stuyvesant to bear his surname was Augustus van Horne Stuyvesant, Jr., who died a bachelor in 1953 at the age of 83 in his mansion at 2 East 79th Street. Rutherfurd Stuyvesant, the 19th-century New York developer, and his descendants are also descended from Peter Stuyvesant; however, Rutherford Stuyvesant's name was changed from Stuyvesant Rutherford in 1863 to satisfy the terms of the 1847 will of Peter Gerard Stuyvesant.

His descendants include:
 Hamilton Fish (1808–1893), the 16th Governor of New York, a United States senator and United States Secretary of State
 John Winthrop Chanler (1826–1877), a lawyer and a U.S. Representative from New York
 Stuyvesant Fish Morris (1843–1928), a prominent physician.
 Stuyvesant Fish (1851–1923), a President of the Illinois Central Railroad who was prominent in the U.S. Gilded Age
 Lewis Stuyvesant Chanler (1869–1942), a Lieutenant Governor of New York
 Edith Stuyvesant Gerry (1873–1958), an American philanthropist who was married to George Washington Vanderbilt II and Peter Goelet Gerry
 Loudon Wainwright Jr. (1924–1988), an American writer
 John Smith (1931–1995), the American actor who starred in two NBC western television series Cimarron City, is a descendant.
 Loudon Wainwright III (b. 1946), the American singer-songwriter is a descendant through his great-great-grandfather John Howard Wainwright, who married Margaret Stuyvesant.
 Peter Robinson (Robin) Fish (b. 1969), Deputy Head at Robert Gordon's College
 Chase Coleman III (b.1975), Hedge fund manager, Tiger Global Management

Legacy

According to historian Eleanor Bruchey:
Peter Stuyvesant was essentially a difficult man thrust into a difficult position. Quick tempered, self-confident, and authoritarian, he was determined...to rule firmly and to repair the fortunes of the company. The company, however, had run the colony solely for trade profits, with scant attention to encouraging immigration and developing local government. Stuyvesant's predecessors...had been dishonest or, at best, inept, so there was no tradition of respect and support for the governorship on which he could build. Furthermore, the colonists were vocal and quick to challenge authority....Throughout his administration there were constant complaints to the company of his tyrannical acts and pressure for more local self-government....His religious intolerance also exacerbated relations with the colonists, most of whom did not share his narrow outlook.

Stuyvesant and his family were large landowners in the northeastern portion of New Amsterdam, and the Stuyvesant name is currently associated with four places in Manhattan's East Side, near present-day Gramercy Park: the Stuyvesant Town housing complex; the site of the original Stuyvesant High School, still marked Stuyvesant on its front face, on East 15th Street near First Avenue, Stuyvesant Square, a park in the area; and the Stuyvesant Apartments on East 18th Street. The new Stuyvesant High, a premier public high school, is on Chambers Street near the World Trade Center.  His farm, called the "Bouwerij" – the seventeenth-century Dutch word for "farm" – was the source for the name of the Manhattan street and surrounding neighborhood named "The Bowery". The contemporary neighborhood of Bedford–Stuyvesant, Brooklyn includes Stuyvesant Heights and retains its name. Also named after him are the hamlets of Stuyvesant and Stuyvesant Falls in Columbia County, New York, where descendants of the early Dutch settlers still live and where the Dutch Reformed Church remains an important part of the community, as well as shopping centers, yacht clubs and other buildings and facilities throughout the area where the Dutch colony once was.

The Peter Stuyvesant Monument by J. Massey Rhind situated at Bergen Square in Jersey City was dedicated in 1915 to mark the 250th anniversary of the Dutch settlement there

The World War II Liberty Ship  was named in his honor.

In popular culture
 1809 – A heavily exaggerated Stuyvesant features as the protagonist of the latter three books of Washington Irving's satirical History of New York. 
 1819 – Stuyvesant is mentioned in Irving's short story "Rip Van Winkle" in the following passage: "...just about the beginning of the government of the good Peter Stuyvesant (may he rest in peace!)..." and a bit later: "...who figured so gallantly in the chivalrous days of Peter Stuyvesant..."
 1925 – Debut of the ongoing Disney villain character Pete, a criminal anthropomorphic bear or (later) cat, typically shown or implied to have an artificial leg, and often billed as Peg Leg (or "Pegleg") Pete after Stuyvesant, regardless of whether a literal peg leg is portrayed.
 1927–1962 – The passenger ferry Peter Stuyvesant operated on the Hudson River between New York City and New Jersey. In 1963, it was purchased and placed on permanent mooring next to Anthony's Pier 4 in Boston, Massachusetts; it broke free, listed then sank during the Blizzard of 1978.
 1938 – Stuyvesant is the major antagonist in the Kurt Weill-Maxwell Anderson musical Knickerbocker Holiday, in which he sings "September Song". In the original stage production he was portrayed by Walter Huston; in the much-altered 1944 film version he was portrayed by Charles Coburn in his only singing role.
 c.1945 – The old time radio show Duffy's Tavern had an episode which used a newly discovered diary of Stuyvesant as a plot device.
 1954–present – A cigarette brand by Philip Morris International and Imperial Tobacco with British American Tobacco is named Peter Stuyvesant. These cigarettes are popular in Germany, Australia, Greece, New Zealand, Zambia, Malaysia and South Africa.
 1955 – In the television production of the Rodgers and Hart musical Dearest Enemy, General Howe (Cyril Ritchard) and Captain Copeland (Robert Sterling) sing "Sweet Peter", a less-than-complimentary song about Stuyvesant
 1966 – In the last episode of season 3 of My Favorite Martian Tim and Martin travel back in time and meet Peter Stuyvesant. They almost prevent the sale of Manhattan to the Dutch.
 1978 – In Charles Bukowski's novel Women, the main character, Henry Chinaski, vomits on Peter Stuyvesant's burial vault cover before a poetry reading at St. Mark's Church.
 1986 –The German singer-songwriter Rio Reiser used Peter Stuyvesant founding New York as an example of a real event in his song "Alles Lüge" ("All Lies"), which contrasts real and false events. The song also plays on the namesake cigarette brand.
 2001 – Stuyvesant was a key figure in the Belgian comic strip Suske en Wiske ("Spike and Suzy") in episode 269, "De Stugge Stuyvesant".
 2005 – In the computer game Civilization IV, Peter Stuyvesant is one of the leaders of the Dutch colonies. Adriaen van der Donck is the other possible Dutch leader. In Sid Meier's Colonization computer game, Stuyvesant can be elected to the Continental Congress, allowing the player to build custom houses which automate trade with the mother country.
 2013 – Stuyvesant appears in Jean Zimmerman's novel The Orphanmaster, in which he is portrayed as somewhat tyrannical and not well-liked by the settlers of New Amsterdam.
 2016 – In the American animated TV series The Venture Bros., Dean Venture attends Stuyvesant University starting in the show's sixth season. The fictional college is located in New York City, and its logo features Peter Stuyvesant with the words "Passus sum cum ligneo cruris" or "I have suffered with a wooden leg."
2018 – Stuyvesant is a major character in the novel The Judge Hunter by Christopher Buckley.
2021 - Peter Stuyvesant was referenced as a New York historical figure in the Dungeons & Dragons actual-play show Dimension 20: The Unsleeping City, set in New York. Specifically, his wooden leg played a role as a seemingly minor artifact that symbolized very significant events.

See also

 Adriaen van der Donck
 History of the Jews in the Netherlands
 Colonial history of the United States
 Dutch colonization of the Americas
 Dutch Empire
 Peter Minuit
 List of colonial governors of New York

References
Informational notes

Citations

Further reading
 
 
 
 Bruchey, Eleanor. "Stuyvesant, Peter" in John A. Garraty, ed. Encyclopedia of American Biography (2nd ed. 1996) p. 1065 online 
 
 Jacobs, Jaap (2005), New Netherland: A Dutch Colony in Seventeenth-Century America (Leiden: Brill Academic Publishers), .
 Kessler, Henry H., and Eugene Rachlis. Peter Stuyvesant and His New York (1959). online
 Krizner, L. J., and Lisa Sita. Peter Stuyvesant: New Amsterdam and the Origins of New York (Rosen, 2000) for middle schools.
 Merwick, Donna. Stuyvesant Bound: An Essay on Loss Across Time (U of Pennsylvania Press, 2013) 212 pp
 Shaw Romney, Susanah. "Peter Stuyvesant: Premodern Man" Reviews in American History (2014) 42#4 pp 584–589. review of Merwick.
 Otto, Paul. "Stuyvesant, Peter" American National Biography (1999) online, a short scholarly biography
 
 Shorto, Russell. The Island at the Center of the World: the epic story of Dutch Manhattan and the forgotten colony that shaped America (New York: Doubleday, 2004).
 Tuckerman, Bayard. Peter Stuyvesant (JA Hill, 1893) online.
 Whitridge, Arnold. "Peter Stuyvesant: Director General of New Netherland." History Today (May 1960) 10#4 pp 324–332.

Primary sources
 O'Callaghan, Edmund B. ed., Documents Relative to the Colonial History of the State of New York (Albany: Weed, Parsons and Company, 1854), 3:387; Elizabeth Donnan, ed., Documents Illustrative of the History of the Slave Trade to America (Washington, DC : Carnegie Institution, 1930), 3:429.

External links

  Appleton's Biography
  Civil and Political History of New Jersey, 1848
  Journal of New Netherland 1647. Written in the Years 1641, 1642, 1643, 1644, 1645, and 1646

1610s births
1672 deaths
Dutch slave owners
American folklore
American people of Frisian descent
Antisemitism in North America
Peter Stuyvesant
Directors of New Netherland
Dutch amputees
Dutch emigrants to New Netherland
People from Weststellingwerf
People of the Province of New York
Peter
University of Franeker alumni
Antisemitism in the Netherlands